Laurențiu Moldovan (born 1 November 1959) is a Romanian former football midfielder.

Honours
Dinamo București
Divizia A: 1981–82, 1982–83
Cupa României: 1981–82
Universitatea Cluj
Divizia B: 1984–85

Notes

References

1959 births
Living people
Romanian footballers
Association football midfielders
Liga I players
Liga II players
Liga III players
FCM Bacău players
FC Dinamo București players
CS Corvinul Hunedoara players
FC Universitatea Cluj players
CSM Unirea Alba Iulia players